The UAAP Season 81 seniors division football tournament started on February 17, 2019, with the Men's tournament played at the FEU-Diliman Football Field in Quezon City, some matches were played in Moro Lorenzo Football Field inside Ateneo as the Rizal Memorial Stadium is under renovation. While the women's division started on March 3, 2019 at Circulo Verde.

In the Finals of the Juniors Division, FEU Diliman successfully defended their crown for a record 9 consecutive title after defeating Nazareth School Nation University Bullpups 1 nil at Moro Lorenzo Football Field in the Ateneo de Manila University campus.

Men's tournament

Elimination round

Team standings

First round

Second round

See also
 UAAP Season 81

Notes

References 

81
2019 in Philippine football